Programs previously aired by the Radio Philippines Network and CNN Philippines broadcasts a variety of programming through its VHF terrestrial television station RPN TV-9 Manila. This article also includes shows previously aired by RPN as itself, and other previous incarnations. For the currently aired shows on CNN Philippines, go to the article: List of programs broadcast by CNN Philippines.

Local defunct shows

Game shows
Battle of the Brains (1992-2000)
Blackout (1988)
Family Kuarta o Kahon (1984–2000)
Geym Na Geym (1981–1982)
It's A Date (1993–1994)
Kol TV¹ (2007–2008)
Match TV (2002–2003)
Spin-A-Win (1975–1985)
Star Date
Super Suerte sa 9 (1987)

Informative
Business Class (1991–2000)
Business Expedition
ETC Vibe (2011–2013)
ETC Watchlist (2011–2013)
Para Po (2005)
The Scene (2001)
Small Acts, Big Stories
Superbrands (2005–2006)
TWBF (This Week's Big Five) (2009)
Two Stops Over

Morning shows
Daybreak (2013–2015)
Good Morning Misis! (1996–1997)
Magandang Morning Philippines! (2003–2004)
One Morning Cafe (2007–2010)
Wake Up Call (1994–1998)

Music videos and movie trailer line-up
The American Chart Show (1985–1989)
Box Office Hit Parade
Cinema Cinema (1993–1997)
Cinema Cinema Cinema (1997–1999)
The Fuse
I-Music (2007)
Mega Cinema Review (1989–1994)
Movie Line-Up
Movieparade (1991–1995)
The Top 10 Movie Trailers of the Week
Video Hit Parade
Video Hot Tracks

Reality

Ang Bagong Kampeon (1985–1988)
Barkada sa 9
Clear Men Future League (2009)
Gen M
House of Hoops (2009–2010)
I Am Meg (2012–2013)
IKON Philippines (2007)
It's A Date (1991–1995)
Match TV (2002–2003)
Mega Fashion Crew (2011–2013)
Mega Young Designers Competition (2012–2013)
One Night with an Angel (2007)
Pasikatan sa 9 (1993–1995)
Miss Earth
Philippines' Next Top Model (2007)
Project Runway Philippines (2012)
Shoot That Babe (2007–2008)
Single Girls (2007)
The So-called Life Of Ryan Garcia Is Going Public (2007)
Something To Chew On With Xandra Rocha
Star Search sa 9 (1996–1997)
Warriors: Celebrity Boxing Challenge (2009)
What I See with Paco Guerrero (2013–2015)

Newscasts

Arangkada Chavacano (2000–2006)
Arangkada Sa Nueve Davao (2001)
Arangkada Ulat sa Tanghali (1999–2000)
Cebuano News (2013–2017)
CNN Philippines Headline News (2015–2016)
CNN Philippines Network News (2012–2017)
CNN Philippines Nightly News (2012–2016)
Daybreak (2013–2015)
Eyewitness Reports (1969–1970)
Global Conversations (2015–2016)
The Hour Updates (1989–1994)
Kapampangan News (2014–2017)
KBS Spot Check (1969–1973)
The Headlines (2013–2015)
Mga Balita ni Efren Montes (1972–1973)
Newsday (2013–2015)
NewsWatch (1970–2012)
RPN iWatch News (2007–2008)
RPN NewsCap (2009–2012)
RPN NewsWatch Aksyon Balita (2006–2008)
NewsWatch Balita Ngayon
NewsWatch sa Umaga
NewsWatch sa Tanghali
NewsWatch Evening Edition
NewsWatch Final Edition
NewsWatch Evening Cast
NewsWatch Prime Cast
NewsWatch Pilipino Edition (1981–1985)
NewsWatch Second Edition (2008–2009)
NewsWatch Now (2001–2007)
NewsWatch International (1977–1990)
Primetime Balita (2000–2001)
RPN Arangkada Balita (2004–2006)
RPN Arangkada Xtra Balita (2000–2004)
RPN NewsBreak (1982–1989, 1994–2003)
RPN News Update (2003–2008)
RPN NewsWatch Update (2008–2011)
The Saturday Report
The Sunday Report
This Week Tonight (1977–1989)

Drama

Agila (produced by TAPE Inc., 1987–1989)
Agos (1987–1988)
Ako... Babae (1994)
Ang Makulay Na Daigdig ni Nora (1974–1979)
Ang Pangarap Kong Jackpot (1995–2007)
Anna Luna, Ikalawang Aklat (1994–1995)
Bakit Ba Ganyan? (2002-2004)
Bedtime Stories
Bisperas ng Kasaysayan (1994–1995)
Boracay (1990)
Cebu I, Cebu II (1991–1992)
Charo (1988)
Coney Reyes - Mumar on the Set (1981–1984, produced by CAN Television)
Coney Reyes on Camera (1984–1989, produced by TAPE, Inc.)
Correctionals (1989–1990)
Davao: Ang Gintong Pag-Asa (1991)
Dayuhan
De Buena Familia (1992–1993)
Dear Manilyn (1988–1991)
Flordeluna (1979–1984, 1987–1988)
Gapo (1994)
Gulong ng Buhay (1981–1983)
Gulong ng Palad (1979–1981)
Hanggang Kailan, Anna Luna?: Ikalawang Aklat (1994–1995)
Heredero (produced by TAPE Inc., 1984–1987)
Hilda Drama Specials (1989)
Kapag Nasa Katwiran... Ipaglaban Mo! (1999-2000)
La Aunor (1984)
Lumayo Ka Man (1993–1996)
Makulay ang Daigdig ni Nora (1976–1978)
Malayo Pa ang Umaga (1993–1995)
May Bukas Pa (produced by Viva Television, 2000–2001)
May Puso ang Batas (2003–2004)
Miranova (1994–1995)
Mukha ng Buhay (produced by Viva Television, 1996)
Pamilya
Paglipas ng Panahon (1983–1985)
Paraiso (produced by D'JEM Productions)
Seiko TV Presents (1988–1989)
Simply Snooky (1986–1988)
Talambuhay (1981–1985)
Tanglaw ng Buhay (1990–1994)
Teenage Diary (1986–1988)
Tierra Sangre (produced by Viva Television, 1996)
Verdadero (1986–1988)
Young Love, Sweet Love (1987–1993)

Action
Ang Panday (1986–1988)
Krusada Kontra Krimen (2005–2007)

Fantasy and horror
Captain Barbell (1987–1988)
Chinese Movies
Darna (1977)
Julian Talisman (1983–1984)
Lily Tubig (1991)
Mga Kakaibang Horror Stories, Totoo Kaya?
Mga Kakaibang Kuwento, Totoo Kaya?
Nora Cinderella (1984–1985)
Ora Engkantada (1996–1998)
Wari Waro (1988–1991)
Zarda (1974–1976)

Variety

Aawitan Kita (1977–1997)
Aksyon, Komedya, Drama ATBP. (1993–1998)
Ayan Eh! (1970)
Barkada sa 9 (1977–1980)
Big Ike's Happening (1975–1983)
Biz Show Na 'To! (2007)
Broadcast Campus (1973–1979)
Carmen In Color (1971–1977)
Chibugan Na! (1994–1996)
Dance 10 (1982–1983, produced by Our Own Little Way Productions)
Eat Bulaga! (1979–1989, produced by TAPE, Inc.)
The Eddie-Nora Show (1970–1972)
Fantastik Jeanne in Motion (1970–1976)
The Imelda Papin Show (2003–2004)
Kami Naman! (1990)
Kumpletos Recados (1976–1978)
Let's Dance with Becky Garcia (1996–1998)
Lotlot & Friends (1985–1988)
Lucky Stars (1980)
Manilyn Live! (1990–1991)
Maricel Live! (1986–1988)
Movieparade (1991–1995)
The New Oh Rosemarie (1971)
The Nida-Lita Show (1973–1977)
On D'Spot (2004–2006)
Pipwede (1977–1980)
Rhapsody (1990)
Sabado Boys (2007)
Santos, Mortiz & Associates (1973–1974)
Student Canteen (1989–1990)
Superstar (1975–1989)
Superstar: Beyond Time (1994–1995)
Tony Santos Presents (1973–1977)
Your Evening with Pilita (1994–1995)

Comedy

Ang Manok ni San Pedro (1987)
Apple Pie, Patis, Atbp. (1987–1989)
ATM: Anette, Tonyboy & Maria (1993–1994)
Ayos Lang, Pare Ko (1977)
Barangay U.S.: Unang Sigaw (1994–1995)
Basta Barkada (1978)
Bogart Case Files¹ (2014–2016)
Buddy en Sol (1990–1995)
Cafeteria Aroma (1979)
Champoy (1980–1985)
Clubhouse 9 (1977–1978)
Co-Ed Blues (1987–1988)
Dalawang Tisoy (2007)
Dobol Trobol (1989)
D'on Po Sa Amin (1994)
Dr. Potpot and the Satellite Kid (1985)
Duplex (1980–1984)
The Front Act Show (2010–2011)
Gabi ni Dolphy (1990)
Ganito Kami Ngayon, O Ano Ha (1994)
Hoy! (1990–1991)
In DA Money (2005)
Iyan ang Misis Ko (1970–1972)
Joey and Son (1980–1983)
John En Marsha (1973–1990)
Just the 3 of Us (1992–1993)
Kaluskos-Musmos (1984–1989)
Kami Naman! (1990)
Kapiterya Pinoy (2001-2002)
Ke-Mis: Kay Misis Umaasa (2007)
Mag-Asawa'y Di Biro (1990–1993)
Mommy Ko si Tita (1993–1994)
Mongolian Barbecue Sa 9 (1992–1994)
My Son, My Son (1977)
No Permanent Address (1986)
Pinky and Boyet
Plaza 1899 (1986–1988)
Purungtong (1991–1993)
Ready na Direk! (1991–1993)
Sa Kabukiran (1986)
Sabi ni Nanay (2007)
Starzan (1990–1991)
Stir (1988)
Tambakan Alley (1981–1983)
Tipitipitim Tipitom (2005)
Tokshow With Mr. Shooli (1999–2000)
T.S.U.P (1990)
What's Up 'day! (2003)

Current affairs

Action 9 (1993–1998)
Agenda (2015–2016)
Back To Back (1996)
Balikatan
Banyuhay (1988–1989)
Blotter (1989–1990)
Buhay Pinoy (2004–2007)
Business Class (1991–2001)
Compañero y Compañera (2000–2001)
Cerge for Truth (2003–2007)
Daybreak (2013–2015)
Dee's Day (2003–2007)
Direct Line (2003–2006)
Diyos at Bayan (2003–2005)
The Doctor Is In (1994; 2001–2004)
The Estrada Presidency (1998–2001)
Exclusively Hers
The Executive Report
First Lady ng Masa
For M (2006–2007)
FVR Up Close (1992–1998)
Global Conversations (2015–2016)
Headlines Exposed (2004–2005)
Helpline sa 9 (1981–1983)
Hirit Kabayan
Ikaw at ang Batas (2000–2007)
The Imelda Papin Show (2003–2004)
Insight Inside (2004–2007)
Isyung Pinoy (previously Isip Pinoy; 1987–1991)
Isumbong Mo! (Tulfo Brothers) (2006)
Isumbong Mo Kay Tulfo (1996–2006)
Isyu (1981–1985)
Kakampi (2000–2001)
Kapatid (2005–2006)
Kapihan ng Bayan (2005–2007)
Kasangga Mo ang Langit (1998–2007)
Kaya Natin 'To!
Legal Forum (1992–2006)
Legal Help Desk (2013–2016)
Madam Ratsa Live! (2003–2004)
Makabayang Duktor (2005–2007)
Make My Day with Larry Henares 
Malacañang Press Conference
Mare, Mag-Usap Tayo
News Café (2013–2015)
News.PH (2013–2017)
Newslight (1994–2001)
Ngayon na, Pinoy!
Dial OCR (1973–1980)
Opposing Views (2013–2015)
Our Doctors (1970)
One Morning Cafe (2007–2010)
The Police Hour (1992–2007)
Political Insider (2016–2017)
Prangkahan (2003–2005)
Public Access Programs
Pulsong Pinoy (2011–2012)
Ratsada Balita (2000–2006)
RPN Forum (2003–2005)
RPN NewsWatch Junior Edition (2008–2009)
Sa Bayan (2000–2001)
Sama-Sama, Kayang-Kaya!
Serbisyo All Access (2014–2017)
Stop Watch (1986–1994)
Street Pulse (1986)
Tapatan with Jay Sonza (2000–2001)
Teka! Teka! Teka!
Tell the People (1983–1997)
The Service Road (2016–2017)
TimesFour
To Saudi with Love (2000)
OPS-PIA: Ugnayan sa Hotel Rembrandt (1992–2001)
Ugnayang Pambansa (2003–2005)
Wats UP sa Barangay (1993–1994)
The Working President (2001–2010)
World Class

Children's

Batibot (1984–1991)
Eskwela ng Bayan (2003)
Alikabuk
Karen's World
Solved
Why?
For Kids Only (2000–2002)
Jr. News (2004–2005)
Kids To Go (1999–2000)
Kids TV (2004–2006)
Kids World
NewsWatch Kids Edition (1979–1993)
Pedya: TV Day Care (1990)
Penpen De Sarapen (1987–2001)
Star Smile Factory (1993–1996)
Storyland (2002–2005)
Uncle Bob's Children's Show (1997–2000)
The Whimpols (1992–1995)
Yan Ang Bata (1995–2000; re-runs, 2002–2005)

Educational

Basta Barkada (1989–1995)
Beauty School with Ricky Reyes (1990–1994)
Beauty School Plus (1994–2005)
Better Home Ideas (1996–2001)
Bogart Case Files (2014–2016)
Comida con Amor
Cooking.Com (2001–2003)
Cooking It Up With Nora Daza (1985–1987)
Cooking with the Stars (1995)
DOG TV (2010–2011)
Fora Medica
Gandang Ricky Reyes (2005–2006)
Go Negosyo (2006–2007)
Go Negosyo Big Time (2007)
House of Beauty (1991)
How 'Bout My Place (1999–2004)
Kalusugan TV (2006–2007)
KPlus! (2005)
Kusina Atbp. (1995–1999)
Luks Family (2002–2003)
Lutong Bahay (1985–1989)
Mag-Negosyo Tayo! (2005–2007)
Make-Over (2006–2007)
Mommy Hacks (2015)
Novartis Payo ni Doc (2002–2004)
Parenting 101 (2007)
Something to Chew On (2013–2015, 2016–2017)
Staying Alive (1979–1980)
Teka Teka Teka
Tipong Pinoy (1999–2000)
Veggie, Meaty & Me (1992–1996)
What's Up 'day! (2003)

Film and special presentation

Afternoon Movie
Afternoon Shockers
Big Hit Movies
Cinehouse 9
C/S Blockbusters (2008–2009)
C/S Movie Mania (2009)
Chinese Movies
Daily Matinee (1980)
Dalisay Theater
Dolphy Movies
English Movies
ETC Flix (2011–2013)
French Movies
Friday Movies in Private
Friday Night Picturehouse
Gintuang Ala-Ala
Last Full Show (2007)
Magsine Tayo!
The Marcos Diaries: A Public View of Private Lives (1989)
Midnight Movies
Midweek Specials
Monday's Television Marvels
Morning Theater
Movie Matinee
Movie Monday
Movie Treat
Movies You Missed On Primetime
Pamana Espesyal
Pilipino Klasiks
Rated Wide Awake Movies
Relax (Watch a Movie)
RVQ Movie Specials
Sampaguita Pictures (1990)
Saturday Night Playhouse
Sinag 9
Sinag sa 9
Sine sa 9
Sinebisyon
Solar's Big Ticket (2010–2011)
Solar's Golden Ticket (2009–2010)
Studio 9 Presents
Sunday's Big Event
Super Tagalog Movies
Tagalog Movie Special
Teatro Pilipino
TGOF: TV Greats on Friday
Thursday Night Specials
Thursday Suspense Theater
True Confessions ng mga Bituin
Tuesday Night Treat
Wednesday Specials
Weekend Specials
World Premiere Presents

Infomercial
Contact Magazine
EZ Shop (2004–2007) 
Give a Life Informercial
Global Window
Home Shopping Network (2003–2014)
Japan Video Topics
The Quantum Channel (1996–2005)
Prime K: Primera Klase
Tagamends
TV Window Shop
USIS Filler Film
Value Vision (1998–2007)
Winner TV Shopping (2005–2007)

Religious

Ang Dating Daan (1992–1998)
Ang Iglesia ni Cristo (1983–1990)
Asin at Ilaw (2000–2007)
Cathedral of Praise with David Sumrall (2003–2005)
The Chaplet Of The Divine Mercy (1985–2007)
Church of God (1983–1985)
Diyos at Bayan (2003–2005)
Emmanuel TV (2007)
Enjoying Everyday Life
Family Rosary Crusade (1987–2007)
Friends Again (2003–2007)
Heart to Heart Talk (1992–2007)
Island Life (1983–1993)
Jesus The Healer (2003–2005)
Jesus I Trust In You (1985–2007)
Kerygma TV (2003–2007)
Life In The Word (1996–2005)
May Liwanag (2006–2007)
Oras ng Himala (2006–2007)
The Power to Unite (2007)
Shalom (1979–2007)
Sharing In The City (1979–2007)
Signs and Wonders (2002–2007)
Spiritual Vignettes (1978–1998)
Sunday Mass (1985–2007)
This is Your Day (2003–2007)
The World Tomorrow (1989–1999)
What Would Jesus Do? (2001–2006)

Sports shows

Auto Extreme (2002–2007)
The Basketball Show (2005–2007)
Body & Machine (2001–2007)
Clear Men Future League (2009)
Extreme Games 101 (2005–2007)
Finishline (2007–2008)
Fight Night (1981–1983)
Fistorama (2003–2007)
Gameplan (2007)
Golf Power (2003–2005)
Golf Power Plus (2005–2007)
The Greatest Fights (2001)
House of Hoops (2009–2010)
In This Corner (2003–2007)
Jai Alai Cagayan
The Main Event (returned to air on C/S 9) (2005–2010)
Man & Machine (2005–2007)
MICAA on KBS (1972–1981)
Muscles in Motion (1988–1989)
NBA Jam (2003–2007)
NBA on RPN (2004–2007)
NBA on C/S (2008)
NBA on C/S 9 (2008–2009)
NBA on Solar TV (2009–2011)
Olympic Library (1983–1984)
PBA Greatest Games
PBA on C/S 9 (2008–2009)
PBA on KBS (1975–1977, PBA basketball would return for the 2008 season)
PBA on Solar TV (2009–2011)
PBL on RPN (returned to air as "PBL on C/S 9")
PCCL Games (2002–2008)
Premier Dart (2007–2009)
Punch Out (2009)
A Round Of Golf (2008–2009)
RPN Sports Library (1981–1983)
Sargo (2007)
Sports in Focus
Sports Inside Out (1989)
Sports Review (1991–2005)
Today at the Games (1984)
TruSports (2007–2010)
UAAP Games (1989–1994) (with Silverstar Sports)
Warriors: Celebrity Boxing Challenge (2009–2010)

Talk shows

General
A Second Look
The Bob Garon Debates
CityLine
Dee's Day (2003–2007)
Good Morning Misis! (1996–1999)
K Na Tayo! (2007)
Oh Yes, Johnny's Back! (2004–2005)
Real People
Talk Toons (2007)
Teen Talk (1995)
Tell The People (1983–1997)
Tell The People... Now (1997)
Toksho with Mr. Shooli (1999–2000)
Youth Alive (2007)

Showbiz-oriented
Actually, Yun Na! (1994–1996)
Let's Talk Movies
Nap Knock (1996–1997)
Showbiz Ka! (2007)
Showbiz Talk of the Town (1987–1988)
Talk Toons¹ (2007)
The Truth And Nothing But (2000–2002)

Travel
Biyaheng Langit (2000–2007)
Islands Life (2003–2004)
J2J (1994–1997)
Road Trip (2002–2005)
What I See (2013–2015)
W.O.W.: What's On Weekend (2005–2007)

Youth oriented

Barkada Sa 9 (1981–1982)
Basta Barkada (1978)
Broadcast Campus (1973–1979)
Chill Spot (2012–2013)
Clubhouse 9 (1978)
ETC HQ (2012–2013)
ETCETERA (2011–2013)
The Front Act Show (2010–2011)
It's A Date (1993–1995)
Junior Newswatch (1993–2000)
Kol TV (2007–2008)
Lotlot & Friends (1985–1988)
Manilyn Live! (1990–1991)
Match TV (2002–2003)
RPN NewsWatch Junior Edition (2008–2009)
Sabado Boys (2007)
Side Stitch (2002–2003)
Teen Talk (1995)
Teenage Diary (1986–1988)
Young Love, Sweet Love (1987–1993)
Youth Alive (2005–2007)

Regional programming

Arangkada sa Nueve (2000-2003)
Bantawan sa Kinabuhi (1981–1982, produced by Galactica Productions)
Free to Choose (1982)
Issues ug Tubag (1979–1980)
Maayong Buntag Sugbo (1979–1980)
NewsWatch Cebuano Edition (1979–1988)
NewsWatch Central Visayas (1988–2012)
NewsWatch Davao (1987–1989, 2003–2005)
NewsWatch Southern Mindanao (1989-2000)
NewsWatch Western Visayas (1987-1998)
NewsWatch Zamboanga (1987–1999)
Pan sa Kinabuhi (2000–2005)
Question Hour (1983–1985, produced by Bulwanon Productions)

Acquired programming

Asianovelas
Mr. Fighting
Oshin

Drama

American
The Six Million Dollar Man (1975–1978)
Seven Days

Chinese
Romance in the Rain (2007)

Indonesian
Pinokyo at ang Blue Fairy (2007)

Mexican
Acapulco, Cuerpo y Alma

Telenovelas

Alguna Vez Tendremos Alas
Carita de Ángel (2003)
Luz Clarita
La Dueña
Esmeralda
Gente bien
Luz y Sombra
Maria del Cielo (2000–2001)
Maria Isabel
María la del Barrio 
MariMar (1996)
Monte Cristo (2007)
Los Parientes Pobres
Piel
Por un beso (2003)
Preciosa
Quinceañera (2000–2001)
Serafín (2000–2001)
Siempre te amaré (2000–2001)
Simplemente Maria
Sin Ti
La Intrusa
La Traidora
La Usurpadora
La Viuda de Blanco

American TV shows

The $1,000,000 Chance of a Lifetime
2 Broke Girls (2011–2013)
24
30 Rock
The 4400
60 Minutes (2013–2015)
7 Deadly Hollywood Sins
8 Simple Rules (2003–2004)
Acapulco H.E.A.T.
The Adventures of Superboy
Age of Love
The Agency (2003–2004)
Airwolf
AJ's Time Travelers
ALF
Alfred Hitchcock Presents
Ally McBeal (1998–2002)
Amazing Stories
Ambush Makeover
American Dreams
American Gladiators
American Idol (2012–2013)
America's Best Dance Crew
America's Dumbest Criminals
America's Funniest Home Videos
America's Funniest People
America's Got Talent (2009–2011)
America's Next Top Model (2011–2013)
Anderson Live (2013–2014)
Armor of God
Ask Harriet
Austin City Limits
Average Joe
Baby Bob
Babylon 5
The Bachelor
Bachelor Pad
The Bachelorette
Bachelorette Party Las Vegas (2012)
Bare Essence
Battle of the Network Stars
Battlestar Galactica
Baywatch Nights
Beakman's World
Beauty & the Beast (2012–2013)
Becker
Beyond 2000
The Big Bang Theory
The Biggest Loser
Bionic Woman
Blind Justice
Blockbusters
Bones
Buffy the Vampire Slayer
Burn Notice
C-16: FBI
California Dreams
Candid Camera
The Carrie Diaries (2013)
Charles in Charge
Cheers
Chicago Hope
Child's Play
Chuck
City of Angels
Civil Wars
The Class
Close to Home
The Closer
Cold Case
Combat Missions
The Commish
Complete Savages
Conan
Conviction
Covington Cross
Crime Story
Crossing Jordan
CSI: Miami
CSI: NY
Dallas
Dark Angel (2007)
Dark Justice
Date My Mom
Dateline NBC
Dead Zone (2003–2004)
Designing Women
Dharma & Greg
Dirty Dancing
The Dish
Doctor Doctor
Dollhouse
Dominick Dunne's Power, Privilege, and Justice
Double Dare
The Dresden Files
Dress My Nest
Dr. Drew (2015–2016)
Dweebs
E-Ring
Early Today (2013)
Ed
The Ellen DeGeneres Show (2009–2011)
Emily Owens M.D. (2012–2013)
Entertainment Tonight (2001–2006, 2009-2011)
Entourage
Eureka
Everwood
Extra (2011–2013)
Extreme Makeover: Home Edition
Face the Music
Face the Nation
Family Feud
Family Ties
Fantasy Island
Fashion Hunters (2013)
Felicity
Firefly
Flash Gordon
Foody Call
For Love or Money
Forensic Files
Fraggle Rock
The Fresh Prince of Bel-Air (2009–2010)
Friday the 13th: The Series
Friday Night Lights (2011–2012)
Friends (2011–2013)
Fringe (2008–2009)
Full House
Future Weapons
The Game
Girls Behaving Badly
The Girls of the Playboy Mansion
Glee (2011–2013)
The Glee Project (2011–2012)
Gossip Girl (2011–2012)
Hardcastle and McCormick
Harsh Realm (2003)
Hawaii Five-O
Hellcats (2011)
Hercules: The Legendary Journeys
Heroes
High School Reunion
The Hitchhiker
Holding the Baby
Hollywood One-on-One
Hollywood Squares
House of Carters
House of Glam
House of Jazmin
How I Met Your Mother (2011)
How'd They Do That?
Hudson Street
Human Target
Hunter
Hypernauts
I Had Three Wives
In Living Color
The Incredible Hulk
Inside Edition
The Insider (Solar TV: 2009–2011 ETC: 2011–2013)
The Insider Weekend
Invasion
Invisible Man
Is She Really Going Out With Him?
Island Son
It's a Miracle
JAG (2002–2004)
Jake in Progress
The Jamie Kennedy Experiment
Jeopardy!
Jericho
The Jerry Springer Show
John Doe
Journeyman
Just for Laughs
Just Kidding
Kamen Rider Dragon Knight
Keeping Up with the Kardashians
Kids Say the Darndest Things
Kitchen Confidential
Knight Rider
Kojak
Kourtney and Khloé Take Miami
Kung Fu: The Legend Continues
L.A. Law
La Femme Nikita
Last Comic Standing
Late Night with Conan O'Brien
Late Show with David Letterman
Law & Order
Law & Order: Criminal Intent
Law & Order: Special Victims Unit
Legmen
Lie to Me
Lifestyles of the Rich and Famous
The Lying Game (2012–2013)
MacGyver
Mad Fashion
Magnum, P.I.
Make Me a Supermodel
Malcolm In The Middle
Martial Law
Masquerade
Masterminds
Medium
Meet My Folks
The Mentalist
Miami Vice
Millennium
Millionaire Matchmaker
Minute to Win It (2010–2011)
Miss Advised (2013)
Missing Persons (1994)
Models of the Runway (2012–2013)
Modern Family (2009–2010)
Moesha
Monk
Moon Over Miami
Moonlight
Murder One
Mutant X
My Secret Identity
My Sister Sam
My So-Called Life
Mysteries, Magic and Miracles
Name That Tune
Nancy Grace (2015–2016)
Nash Bridges
NBA games (2004–2007, 2008–2011)
NBC Nightly News (2008–2011, 2013–2015)
NCIS (2008–2011)
Ned and Stacy
The New Adventures of Wonder Woman
New Amsterdam
New Girl (2011–2013)
Newton's Apple
The Next (2012)
The Next Big Thing: NY (2013)
Nikita (2011–2013)
Nikki
The Nine
Nip/Tuck
NYPD Blue
omg! Insider (2013)
Once and Again 
One Tree Hill (2007, 2011–2012)
The Originals (2013)
Outback Jack
Over the Top
Oz
Parental Control
Parker Lewis Can't Lose
Party of Five
Pensacola: Wings of Gold
Perfect Strangers
Picket Fences
Pointman
Point Break
The Powers of Matthew Star
Power Rangers Series (2000–2004)
Power Rangers In Space (2000–2001)
Power Rangers Lost Galaxy (2001–2002)
Power Rangers Lightspeed Rescue (2002–2003)
Power Rangers Time Force (2003–2004)
The Practice
The Pretender
Pretty Little Liars (2011–2013)
The Price Is Right (2009–2011)
Prison Break (2005–2009)
Privileged
Profiler
Project Accessory (2013)
Project Runway (2006–2007, 2011–2013)
Project Runway All Stars (2013)
Psych
Pushing Daisies
Pussycat Dolls Present: The Search for the Next Doll
Puttin' on the Hits
Pyramid
Quarterlife
Queer Eye for the Straight Guy
The Rachel Zoe Project
Rags to Riches
Ravenswood (2013)
The Real Housewives of New Jersey
Reasonable Doubts
Real NBA
Rescue 911
Ripley's Believe It Or Not
Roseanne
Roswell
Sabrina, the Teenage Witch
Saturday Night Live
Saved by the Bell
Saving Grace
Scare Tactics
Scrubs (2003–2004)
Sealab 2020 (1980)
SeaQuest 2032
SeaQuest DSV
The Secret Circle (2011–2012)
Seinfeld (1998–2001)
Sex and the City
Sexiest
Shark
The Simple Life
Sledge Hammer!
The Sopranos
Space: Above and Beyond
Sparks
Spencer
Split Ends
Sports Illustrated Swimsuit Model Search
Standoff
Star Search
Star Trek: The Next Generation
Stark Raving Mad
Still Standing
Strange Luck
Street Justice
The Streets of San Francisco
Super Fun Night (2013)
Survivor
Survivor: China
Survivor: Micronesia
Survivor: Nicaragua
Swans Crossing
Sweet Justice
The Swiss Family Robinson
T. and T.
Tales from the Crypt
The Talk (2013–2015)
Taxi
Terminator: The Sarah Connor Chronicles
This is Your Day
Threshold
Thunder in Paradise
Tim Gunn's Guide to Style
TMZ (2011–2013)
TMZ Weekend
Today
Today Weekend
Today's FBI (1982)Today's TalkThe Tonight Show with Jay LenoThe World According to Paris (2012)Treasure HuntersTrue BeautyTV's Bloopers and Practical JokesTwo and a Half MenTwo Guys and a GirlThe Tyra Banks ShowUndercover BossThe Vampire Diaries (Solar TV: 2009–2011, ETC: 2011–2013)Veronica MarsVersusThe VisitorVoyager: The World of National GeographicWelcome to the ParkerWhat I Like About YouWheel of FortuneWhere in Time is Carmen Sandiego?White CollarWho Wants to Marry My Dad?Who's the Boss?WildfireWin, Lose or DrawWithout a TraceThe WizardWizards and WarriorsWKRP in CincinnatiWok With YanWomen's Murder ClubWonderWorksWorld Entertainment ReportThe World TomorrowWorld's Most Amazing VideosThe X-Files (1995–2004, 2008–2009)Xena: Warrior PrincessInformativeBarney & Friends (1999–2003)Sesame Street (1970–1980 (RPN), 2014–2015 (9TV))

Australian TV showsAustralia's Next Top Model (2005–2007)

British TV showsLife on Earth (1984)Top Gear (2013–2015)The World at WarThe Thin Blue LineBanzaiThe Crystal MazeFace the MusicSpace: 1999Canadian TV showsAgainst All OddsAir Crash Investigation (2013–2014)The CampbellsJust for Laughs: GagsMy Secret IdentityYou Can't Do That on TelevisionUndercover Boss: Canada (2014–2015, 2016–2017)

European TV showsLargo (2003–2004)

Anime and TokusatsuAstro BoyDragon BallDragon Ball ZGatchamanCrayon Shin-chanFiveman (1997–1998) (Tagalog version)Goggle V (1998–2000) (Tagalog version)Gundam WingIn the Beginning: Stories from the BibleJetman (1997–1998) (Tagalog version)J.A.K.Q. DengekitaiMacrossMonkey MagicPatlaborPokémon: XY (2014–2015)Raijin-OhRanma ½ (1997)Saint SeiyaSaint TailShaiderSkyranger Gavan (1997–1998) (Tagalog version)SpielbanSpace Battleship Yamato (as Star Blazers)SunvulcanThundersubStarranger	Voltes VVoltronYaibaYu-Gi-Oh!	Zoids: FuzorsCartoon showsThe Adventures of Raggedy Ann and AndyThe Adventures of Young GulliverAdventure TimeAlex and His DogThe All-New Popeye ShowAlvin and the ChipmunksAmigo and FriendsAnimaniacsAs Told By GingerBatman: The Brave and the BoldBen 10Ben 10: Alien Force (now on GTV)Benji, Zax & the Alien PrinceBeware the Batman (2014–2015)Bugs BunnyBratzCapitol CrittersCaptain Planet and the PlaneteersCaptain Power and the Soldiers of the FutureCare Bears: Welcome to Care-a-Lot (2014–2015)Challenge of the GoBotsClass of 3000Codename: Kids Next DoorThe Comic StripKarate KatThe Mini-MonstersStreet FrogsTigersharksThe CriticDanger MouseDefenders of the EarthEarthworm JimEek! The CatEmergency +4Felix The CatFoster's Home for Imaginary FriendsThe FlintstonesG.I. JoeG.I. Joe ExtremeGaltar and the Golden LanceGarfield and FriendsGhostbustersGoing BananasThe Greatest Adventure: Stories from the BibleHe-Man and the Masters of the UniverseThe HerculoidsHey ArnoldThe HerculoidsHi Hi Puffy AmiYumiHobo	Inch High Private EyeInvader ZimKarate KidKiddie ToonsKing of the HillKrypto the SuperdogLand of the LostLegion of Super HeroesThe Life and Times of Juniper LeeLoonatics UnleashedLooney TunesMerrie MelodiesMickey Mouse Club¡Mucha Lucha!Muppet BabiesMy Little PonyPhantom 2040Popeye & SonPound PuppiesThe Powerpuff GirlsRainbow BriteThe Road Runner ShowRocket PowerSamurai JackSealab 2020Science CourtShaggy & Scooby-Doo Get A Clue!ShazzanShe-Ra: Princess of PowerShirt TalesThe Simpsons (1990–2001)Skeleton WarriorsSky CommandersSpace Ghost Coast to CoastSpongeBob SquarePants (2002–2004)Star FleetStrawberry Shortcake's Berry Bitty Adventures (2014–2015)Street FighterSuper FriendsThe Sylvester & Tweety MysteriesSwat KatsTaz-ManiaTeenage Mutant Ninja TurtlesThunderCatsThe TickTom and JerryTom and Jerry KidsWacky RacesWhere's Wally?The Wild ThornberrysWoody WoodpeckerWorld of AnimationYoung Justice (2014–2015)X-Men: EvolutionXiaolin Showdown¹With CNN Philippines

Sports showsABC Wide World of Sports (1981–1991)All-Star WrestlingExtreme Games 101Gameplan (2007)K-1Main EventNBA ActionNBA PlayoffsNBA Games (2004–2007, 2008–2011, 2019–2020)NBA on RPN (2004–2007)NBA on C/S (2008)NBA on C/S 9 (2008–2009)NBA on Solar TV (2009–2011)NBA on CNN Philippines (2019–2020)NFL Game DayReal NBA (2010–2011)Ultimate Fighting ChampionshipWorld Class BoxingWorld Poker TourWWE Raw (2005–2007, 2008–2011)WWE SmackDown (2005–2007, 2008–2011)Versus''

See also
Solar News Channel
9TV
CNN Philippines
CNN Philippines News and Current Affairs
ETC (the former name of Solar News Channel, 9TV and CNN Philippines)
C/S
C/S 9
Solar TV
Radio Philippines Network
List of Philippine television shows
List of programs broadcast by CNN Philippines
Solar Entertainment Corporation
Nine Media Corporation
List of Radio Philippines Network specials aired

Notes

References

CNN Philippines original programming
Radio Philippines Network
Philippine television-related lists

Television in Metro Manila